Hemlock may refer to:

Plants
Conium maculatum, a poisonous herbaceous plant
more broadly, other species in the genus Conium; not to be confused with the related water hemlock and hemlock water-dropwort
Tsuga, a genus of coniferous trees

Places

Communities in the United States
Hemlock, Indiana
Hemlock, Michigan
Hemlock, New York
Hemlock, Ohio
Hemlock, Tillamook County, Oregon
Hemlock, Virginia
Hemlock, Washington
Hemlock, Fayette County, West Virginia
Hemlock, Jackson County, West Virginia
Hemlock, Wisconsin
Hemlock Township, Columbia County, Pennsylvania

Bodies of water
Hemlock Creek (disambiguation)
Hemlock Falls (disambiguation)
Hemlock Lake, one of the Finger Lakes in New York
McKay Lake (Ottawa), formerly known as Hemlock Lake

Music
 Hemlock (band), an American heavy metal band
 Hemlock Ernst, the moniker used by American singer and rapper Samuel T. Herring
 Hemlock Recordings, a British record label founded by musician Untold
 "Hemlock", a song from Peter Hammill's 1988 album In A Foreign Town

Computing
Hemlock (text editor), a variant of the Emacs text editor for Unix
Hemlock (Evergreen series / Radeon HD 5970), a graphics card code-name

Other
 Babe and Carla Hemlock, Mohawk visual artists
 Hemlock, a 1956 painting by Joan Mitchell
Hemlock Society, an American advocacy group
Hemlock Semiconductor Corporation, American manufacturer

See also
 
 Ham Lock